Daniel Alejandro Méndez Noreña (born 2 June 2000) is a Colombian cyclist, who currently rides for UCI ProTeam .

Major results
2018
 1st Overall Challenge Montaña Central de Asturias Junior

References

External links

2000 births
Living people
Colombian male cyclists
Sportspeople from Bogotá
21st-century Colombian people